Gyllene Tider EP is an extended play from Swedish pop group Gyllene Tider, released in 1996 during their reunion tour Återtåget 96. The EP was also released as a bonus EP for the compilation album Halmstads pärlor, and separate, as it also was a single with "Gå & fiska!" as A-side. The EP peaked at number one on the Swedish Singles Chart and was certified platinum by IFPI Sweden. "Gå & fiska!" ("Go & Fish!") was given a Grammis for Best Song of the Year and a Rockbjörnen for Best Swedish Song.

Track listing
 "Gå & fiska!" – 3:56
 "Juni, juli, augusti" – 3:52
 "Harplinge" – 3:44
 "Faller ner på knä" – 3:38

Charts

Weekly charts

Year-end charts

References 

1996 EPs